United Progressive Alliance is an Indian political party coalition led by Indian National Congress.

Seat sharing summary 
For the 2019 Indian general election, the UPA's is an alliance led by Indian National Congress with following parties:

For the 2019 Indian general election, the UPA's candidates for the Lok Sabha constituencies are as follows.

Andhra Pradesh

Arunachal Pradesh

Assam

Bihar

Chhattisgarh

Goa

Gujarat

Haryana

Himachal Pradesh

Jammu and Kashmir

Jharkhand

Karnataka

Kerala

Madhya Pradesh

Maharashtra

Manipur

Meghalaya

Mizoram

Nagaland

Odisha

Punjab

Rajasthan

Sikkim

Tamil Nadu

Telangana

Tripura

Uttar Pradesh

Uttarakhand

West Bengal

Union territory-wise candidate list

Andaman and Nicobar Islands (1)

Chandigarh (1)

Dadra and Nagar Haveli (1)

Daman and Diu (1)

Lakshadweep (1)

Note: UPA member Nationalist Congress Party won, although there was no pre-poll alliance.

NCT of Delhi (7)

Puducherry (1)

See also
 List of constituencies of the Lok Sabha
 Indian National Congress campaign for the 2019 Indian general election

References

 
Lists of Indian political candidates
Indian National Congress